was the eleventh Shikken (1311–1312) of the Kamakura shogunate. He is also known as Osaragi Munenobu.

References

1259 births
1312 deaths
Hōjō clan
People of Kamakura-period Japan